Kjersti Fløttum (born 12 July 1953) is a Norwegian linguist.

After a tenure at Stavanger University College she was employed by the University of Bergen in 1995 where she is a professor of French language. She has been vice rector of international relations and from 2007 to 2011 led the Bergen Summer Research School.

Fløttum is also vice-consul for France in Bergen, and has been active in the Rafto Foundation.

References 

1953 births
Living people
Linguists from Norway
Rhetoricians
Academic staff of the University of Stavanger
Academic staff of the University of Bergen
Norwegian women academics
Members of the Norwegian Academy of Science and Letters